A  (Irish for association; plural ) is the lowest local unit or branch of a number of Irish political parties. The term cumann may also be used to describe a non-political association.

Traditionally, Sinn Féin and Fianna Fáil have called their local branches by that term. Fine Gael also uses the term to describe its local branches in the Clare constituency.

Structure of Fianna Fáil

Structure of Sinn Féin
In Sinn Féin, the party structure is similar to that of Fianna Fáil. The  is a form of district unit covering a number of cumainn over a geographic area (usually a County Council constituency). The  functions as the Sinn Féin national committee and executive; it is composed of elected board members on an all-Ireland basis.

See also

Further reading
 Basil Chubb, The Government and Politics of Ireland

Irish words and phrases
Politics of the Republic of Ireland
Politics of Northern Ireland